The Himantopteridae are a family of moths in the superfamily Zygaenoidea. The family is alternatively included in the family Anomoeotidae as a synonym.

References

Natural History Museum Lepidoptera genus database

 
Moth families
Taxa named by Alois Friedrich Rogenhofer